Michael Davey, MA FRCO LRAM ARCM is an English organist.

Education

He studied at the Royal College of Music where he was awarded the Sir Walford Davies first prize for Organ.  He went on to read music at Cambridge University as organ scholar of Corpus Christi College.

Career

He was assistant organist at Chichester Cathedral between 1968 and 1971. He was appointed director of music at Wrekin College in 1971. He was also organist of St Mary the Boltons, St James the Greater, Leicester and St Martin in the Bull Ring. He is now retired.

References

English organists
British male organists
Living people
Alumni of Corpus Christi College, Cambridge
Assistant Organists of Chichester Cathedral
21st-century organists
21st-century British male musicians
Year of birth missing (living people)
Male classical organists